Thattamala is a neighbourhood situated at the southeast border of Kollam city in state of Kerala, India. It is situated at National Highways – NH 66 (Earlier NH 47). Kerala Police have identified Thattamala as one of the traffic black spots in the state.

Thattamala was a part of old Vadakkevila panchayath before the constitution of Kollam as a city. In 2000, Kollam was upgraded by the Government of Kerala as the 4th Municipal Corporation of Kerala by merging Vadakkevila, Kilikollur, Sakthikulangara and Eravipuram panchayaths with Kollam Municipality.

Major Public/Private Institutions near Thattamala
 Thattamala Post Office
 BSNL Telephone Exchange
 United Electrical Industries Limited...

Schools & Colleges
 Government Vocational Higher secondary school, Thattamala
 Sree Narayana Public School
 VVVHSS Ayathil
 Devi Vilasam Lower Primary School
 Grace International School
 AKM Higher Secondary School
 Mannam Memorial Residential Public School
 The Oxford School, Kollam
 Vimala Hridaya ISC School
 Sree Narayana Institute of Technology
 Younus College Of Engineering & Technology
 N.S. Memorial College Of Nursing
 Travancore Nursing College
 Travancore Nursing College
 Fathima Memorial Training College
 Bemax Academy
 Edugarnet Academy
 Maria Day Care Center
 SN Kids World
 Creative Indian School
 Little Hearts School
 Sanfort Kids Palathara...

Clinical Laboratory & Hospitals
 Government Community Health Centre Palathara
 Government Homoeo Dispensary - Kootikada
 Government Ayurveda dispensary - Pallimukku
 Travancore Medicity Medical College Hospital
 NS Cooperative Hospital 
 Ashtamudi Hospital
 NS Ayurveda hospital 
 OUSHADHI - Ayurveda Shop
 Jaya Clinical Laboratory
 Kamala Clinic- Super speciality ENT center and Pediatric kidney clinic
 SRM Hospital
 AIMS Diagnostic Centre
 RMG Clinic
 Hayat Clinic
 Devi Clinical Laboratory
 Dr Sruthy's Dental Lounge	
 D care Dental Clinic
 Shifa Dental Clinic
 SPM Homoeopathy
 Thottathil Medicals
 Adithya Medicals
 Alchemy Healthcare
 Neethi Medical Store
 Akshaya Medical shop...

Bank, ATM & Financiers
 Canara Bank Thattamala branch
 South Indian Bank Branch
 Vadakkevila service co-operative bank
 Kerala Bank Branch
 Kollam District Co-operative Bank - Branch
 Canara Bank - ATM
 SBI ATM
 Federal Bank ATM -  Inside Medicity
 Axis Bank ATM - Inside Medicity
 Muthoot FinCorp Gold Loan
 Muthoottu Mini Financiers Pvt Ltd
 Manappuram Finance Limited
 Thayyil Financiers...

Automotive Shops
 Anantheswara Motors
 NEXA (Sarathy Autocars, Kollam, Pallimukku)
 NCS KIA KOLLAM
 KTM Kollam
 MG ESN Kollam
 Sarathy Bajaj
 Hercules Maruthi
 Popular Megamotors
 Tata Motors passenger and commercial vehicles
 Tata Motors Cars Showroom - Muthoot Automotive, Kollam Bypass
 Denz Motors Ape Piaggio
 Mahindra First Choice
 Maruti Suzuki TRUE VALUE (Sarathy Autocars)
 Jawa kollam
 Vahini Honda	
 Aprilia Vespa 
 Volkswagen Kollam...

Auditoriums / Halls
 Lalas Convention Centre
 Preethi Auditorium
 Govt Community Hall Vadakkevila
 La-thansa Auditorium
 Rajadhani Auditorium
 Grand Auditorium
 Royal Auditorium
 Brothers Auditorium...

Daily needs shops
 Thattamala Market
 Supplyco Supermarket
 Ration Shops
 Thumpattu Store
 Raj agency
 Fresh Cart Supermarket
 Lakshmi Bakery
 Apple bakery
 Chothy Bakery
 FRUITBAE
 Smoothie Juice Corner and Bakera
 St Jude Gas Service
 Pulimoottil Stores - Beauty Centre
 Rahul Beauty Centre
 Farm Store...

Shops
 Royaloak Furniture Kollam
 Dimos Furniture
 Damro Furniture
 BAS Furniture
 Madathil jewellery
 Mangalya Jewellery
 Mahindra pumps...
 

Health & wellness
 KS Multi Gymnasium
 Las vegas fitness centre
 SNPS swimming pool
 Maithanam Football Turf
 Soccerz Football Turf...

See also
 Kollam
 Mevaram
 Kollam Junction railway station
 Travancore Medical College Hospital, Kollam
 Kollam Bypass

References

Neighbourhoods in Kollam